Friends of the Earth (HK) Charity Limited (FoE (HK)) is  a Hong Kong based environmental organisation founded in 1983. Commonly known as Friends of the Earth (HK) or FoE (HK), it has  a membership of more than 12,000 individuals.

As FoE (HK) receives no regular funding from governments, it relies on donations from the public and volunteer work.

The organisation is active in environmental campaigns and environmental education.  It is not a member group of Friends of the Earth International, owing to disagreements over the latter's policy against commercial sponsorship.

Leadership
The former Director, Mrs Mei Ng, achieved recognition of her work with the organisation when she was elected to the United Nations Global 500 Roll of Honor on World Environment Day in 2000.

Work in mainland China
Since 1992, FoE (HK)'s China team has been networking in mainland China with  women's groups, students, academics, NGOs, cadres and governmental agencies. Hundreds of people in China are enlisted as advisors and honorary members. FoE (HK) has also given an "Earth Award" to people dedicated to environmental issues.

See also

 Conservation biology
 Conservation ethic
 Conservation movement
 Ecology
 Ecology movement
 Environmentalism
 Environmental movement
 Environmental protection
 Freeganism
 Habitat conservation
 Natural environment
 Natural capital
 Natural resource
 Renewable resource
 Sustainable development
 Sustainability

References

External links
 Friends of the Earth (HK) - Official website

Friends of the Earth
Environmental organisations based in Hong Kong
1983 establishments in Hong Kong
Organizations established in 1983